The  Bric Costa Rossa is a mountain of the Ligurian Alps located in Piedmont (NW Italy).

Etymology 
In Piedmontese Bric means mountain or hill, while Costa Rossa con be translated from the Italian as red slope.

Geography 
 
The mountain stands on the ridge dividing the valleys of Vermenagna and Pesio. Southwards the water divide continues heading to the Punta Mirauda and Cima della Fascia while northwards it connects Bric Costa Rossa with the Bisalta (2,231 m). On some books Bisalta refers not just to this summit but to a small massif whose highest elevation is the Bric Costa Rossa.

SOIUSA classification 
According to the SOIUSA (International Standardized Mountain Subdivision of the Alps) the mountain can be classified in the following way:
 main part = Western Alps
 major sector = South Western Alps
 section = Ligurian Alps
 subsection = (It:Alpi del Marguareis/Fr:Alpes Liguriennes Occidentales)
 supergroup = (It:Catena Marguareis-Mongioie/Fr:Chaîne Marguareis-Mongioie) 
 group = (It:Gruppo Testa Ciaudon-Cima della Fascia) 
 subgroup = (It:Costiera del Bric Costa Rossa) 
 code = I/A-1.II-B.3.d

Access to the summit 
The Bric Costa Rossa can be reached by a waymarked footpath which follows the ridge connecting it to the Bisalta. Another hiking route to climb the summit starts from Casali Giachet (a village belonging to the comune of Limone Piemonte).

The mountain is also accessible in winter by ski mountaineers.

Maps

References

Mountains of the Ligurian Alps
Mountains of Piedmont
Two-thousanders of Italy